These are the international rankings of Trinidad and Tobago.

International rankings

References

Trinidad and Tobago